Neeta Puri is an Indian actress who works in Hindi films. She was born in Punjab, India. She made her film debut in 1985. Neeta Puri is married to Khursheed Latif, who is also a Hindi film director. Neeta Puri owns a western clothing and jewelry store named "Neeta Puri's Expressions". She is the winner of Miss India contest of New York in 1983. Neeta Puri now lives in Delaware Water Gap, Pennsylvania.

Filmography

Television

References

External links
 Official Website
 
 
 

Indian film actresses
Living people
Year of birth missing (living people)
Actresses in Hindi cinema
20th-century Indian actresses
American beauty pageant winners
Female models from New York (state)
American people of Indian descent
21st-century American women
Actresses in Malayalam cinema